Zarubino is an urban locality (an urban-type settlement) in Khasansky District of Primorsky Krai, Russia and a port on the Posyet Bay. Population:

History
It was established on October 18, 1928.

Transportation
The Port of Zarubino serves the settlement. In September 2014 a joint Chinese-Russian plan was announce to expand its capacity to 60 million tonnes per year which would make it one of the largest ports in north Asia. There is a ferry across the gulf to Sokcho.

A railway line from the port connects to railway lines running north to Vladivostok, west to Jilin Province in China and south to Rajin in North Korea via Khasan, respectively.

References

Urban-type settlements in Primorsky Krai
Populated places established in 1928
Port cities and towns in Russia